Pseudopoda is a genus of Asian huntsman spiders that was first described by Peter Jäger in 2000.

Species
 it contains 247 species, found in Asia:

Pseudopoda abnormis Jäger, 2001 – India
Pseudopoda acris Zhang, Jäger & Liu, 2023 – Myanmar
Pseudopoda acuminata Zhang, Zhang & Zhang, 2013 – China
Pseudopoda acutiformis Zhang, Jäger & Liu, 2023 – China
Pseudopoda akashi (Sethi & Tikader, 1988) – India
Pseudopoda albolineata Jäger, 2001 – Nepal
Pseudopoda albonotata Jäger, 2001 – Bhutan
Pseudopoda aliena Zhang, Jäger & Liu, 2023 – China
Pseudopoda allantoides Zhang, Jäger & Liu, 2023 – China
Pseudopoda alta Jäger, 2001 – Nepal
Pseudopoda amelia Jäger & Vedel, 2007 – China
Pseudopoda amphitropa Zhang, Jäger & Liu, 2023 – China
Pseudopoda anfracta Zhang, Jäger & Liu, 2023 – Vietnam
Pseudopoda anguilliformis Zhang, Jäger & Liu, 2017 – China
Pseudopoda apiculiformis Zhang, Jäger & Liu, 2023 – China
Pseudopoda applanata Zhang, Jäger & Liu, 2023 – China
Pseudopoda arta Zhang, Jäger & Liu, 2023 – Vietnam
Pseudopoda ashcharya Jäger & Kulkarni, 2016 – India
Pseudopoda auricularis Zhang, Jäger & Liu, 2023 – China
Pseudopoda ausobskyi Jäger, 2001 – Nepal
Pseudopoda bachmaensis Zhang, Jäger & Liu, 2023 – Vietnam
Pseudopoda bacilliformis Zhang, Jäger & Liu, 2023 – China
Pseudopoda bangaga Jäger, 2015 – Myanmar
Pseudopoda baoshanensis Zhang, Jäger & Liu, 2023 – China
Pseudopoda bazhongensis Zhang, Jäger & Liu, 2023 – China
Pseudopoda beibeiensis Zhang, Jäger & Liu, 2023 – China
Pseudopoda biapicata Jäger, 2001 – Myanmar
Pseudopoda bibulba (Xu & Yin, 2000) – China
Pseudopoda bicruris Quan, Zhong & Liu, 2014 – China
Pseudopoda bifaria Zhang, Jäger & Liu, 2023 – India
Pseudopoda birmanica Jäger, 2001 – Myanmar
Pseudopoda brauni Jäger, 2001 – Nepal
Pseudopoda breviducta Zhang, Zhang & Zhang, 2013 – China
Pseudopoda byssina Zhang, Jäger & Liu, 2023 – Thailand
Pseudopoda cangschana Jäger & Vedel, 2007 – China
Pseudopoda caoi Zhang, Jäger & Liu, 2023 – China
Pseudopoda casaria (Simon, 1897) – India
Pseudopoda caudata Zhang, Jäger & Liu, 2023 – Laos
Pseudopoda chauki Jäger, 2001 – Nepal
Pseudopoda chayuensis Zhao & Li, 2018 – China
Pseudopoda cheppe Caleb, 2018 – India
Pseudopoda chiangmaiensis Zhang, Jäger & Liu, 2023 – Thailand
Pseudopoda chishuiensis Zhang, Jäger & Liu, 2023 – China
Pseudopoda chulingensis Jäger, 2001 – Nepal
Pseudopoda chuxiongensis Zhang, Jäger & Liu, 2023 – China
Pseudopoda coenobium Jäger, Li & Krehenwinkel, 2015 – China
Pseudopoda colossa Zhang, Jäger & Liu, 2023 – China
Pseudopoda colubrina Zhao & Li, 2018 – Myanmar
Pseudopoda columnacea Zhang, Jäger & Liu, 2023 – Thailand
Pseudopoda complanata Zhang, Jäger & Liu, 2023 – Thailand
Pseudopoda conaensis Zhao & Li, 2018 – China
Pseudopoda confusa Jäger, Pathoumthong & Vedel, 2006 – China, Laos
Pseudopoda conica Zhang, Jäger & Liu, 2023 – China
Pseudopoda contentio Jäger & Vedel, 2007 – China
Pseudopoda contraria Jäger & Vedel, 2007 – China
Pseudopoda cuneata Jäger, 2001 – Nepal
Pseudopoda curva Zhang, Jäger & Liu, 2023 – China
Pseudopoda daguanensis Zhang, Jäger & Liu, 2023 – China
Pseudopoda daiyunensis Zhang, Jäger & Liu, 2023 – China
Pseudopoda daliensis Jäger & Vedel, 2007 – China
Pseudopoda dama Jäger, 2001 – Nepal
Pseudopoda damana Jäger, 2001 – Nepal
Pseudopoda dao Jäger, 2001 – Thailand
Pseudopoda datangensis Zhang, Jäger & Liu, 2023 – China
Pseudopoda daweiensis Zhang, Jäger & Liu, 2023 – China
Pseudopoda daxing Zhao & Li, 2018 – Myanmar
Pseudopoda dengi Zhang, Jäger & Liu, 2023 – China
Pseudopoda dhulensis Jäger, 2001 – Nepal
Pseudopoda digitaliformis Zhang, Jäger & Liu, 2023 – China
Pseudopoda digitata Jäger & Vedel, 2007 – China
Pseudopoda diversipunctata Jäger, 2001 – Nepal
Pseudopoda drepanoides Zhang, Jäger & Liu, 2023 – China
Pseudopoda emei Zhang, Zhang & Zhang, 2013 – China
Pseudopoda everesta Jäger, 2001 – Nepal
Pseudopoda exigua (Fox, 1938) – China, Thailand
Pseudopoda exiguoides (Song & Zhu, 1999) – China
Pseudopoda explanata Zhang, Jäger & Liu, 2023 – China
Pseudopoda fabularis Jäger, 2008 – India
Pseudopoda falcata Zhang, Jäger & Liu, 2023 – China
Pseudopoda fissa Jäger & Vedel, 2005 – Vietnam
Pseudopoda flabelliformis Zhang, Jäger & Liu, 2023 – India
Pseudopoda flexa Zhang, Jäger & Liu, 2023 – China
Pseudopoda foliiculiaris Zhang, Jäger & Liu, 2023 – China
Pseudopoda gemina Jäger, Pathoumthong & Vedel, 2006 – Laos
Pseudopoda gexiao Zhao & Li, 2018 – Myanmar
Pseudopoda gibberosa Zhang, Zhang & Zhang, 2013 – China
Pseudopoda gogona Jäger, 2001 – Bhutan
Pseudopoda gongschana Jäger & Vedel, 2007 – China
Pseudopoda gracilenta Zhang, Jäger & Liu, 2023 – China
Pseudopoda grahami (Fox, 1936) – China
Pseudopoda grandis Zhang, Jäger & Liu, 2023 – China
Pseudopoda grasshoffi Jäger, 2001 – Nepal
Pseudopoda heteropodoides Jäger, 2001 – Nepal
Pseudopoda hingstoni Jäger, 2001 – India
Pseudopoda hirsuta Jäger, 2001 – Thailand
Pseudopoda huangensis Zhang, Jäger & Liu, 2023 – China
Pseudopoda huanglianensis Zhang, Jäger & Liu, 2023 – China
Pseudopoda huberi Jäger, 2015 – Myanmar
Pseudopoda huberti Jäger, 2001 – Nepal
Pseudopoda hupingensis Zhang, Jäger & Liu, 2023 – China
Pseudopoda hyatti Jäger, 2001 – Nepal
Pseudopoda imparilis Zhang, Jäger & Liu, 2023 – China
Pseudopoda intermedia Jäger, 2001 – Myanmar
Pseudopoda interposita Jäger & Vedel, 2007 – China
Pseudopoda jiangi Zhang, Jäger & Liu, 2023 – China
Pseudopoda jirensis Jäger, 2001 – Nepal
Pseudopoda jiugongensis Zhang, Jäger & Liu, 2023 – China
Pseudopoda kalinchoka Jäger, 2001 – Nepal
Pseudopoda kasariana Jäger & Ono, 2002 – Japan
Pseudopoda kavanaughi Zhang, Jäger & Liu, 2023 – China
Pseudopoda kenmun Tanikawa, 2022 – Japan (Ryukyu Is.)
Pseudopoda khimtensis Jäger, 2001 – Nepal
Pseudopoda kongdangensis Zhang, Jäger & Liu, 2023 – China
Pseudopoda kullmanni Jäger, 2001 – Myanmar, Indonesia (Sumatra)
Pseudopoda kunmingensis Sun & Zhang, 2012 – China
Pseudopoda lacrimosa Zhang, Zhang & Zhang, 2013 – China
Pseudopoda langyaensis Zhang, Jäger & Liu, 2023 – China
Pseudopoda latembola Jäger, 2001 – Nepal
Pseudopoda liui Zhang, Jäger & Liu, 2023 – China
Pseudopoda longa Zhang, Jäger & Liu, 2023 – China
Pseudopoda longcanggouensis Zhang, Jäger & Liu, 2023 – China
Pseudopoda longiuscula Zhang, Jäger & Liu, 2023 – China
Pseudopoda longtanensis Zhang, Jäger & Liu, 2023 – China
Pseudopoda longxiensis Zhang, Jäger & Liu, 2023 – China
Pseudopoda luechunensis Zhang, Jäger & Liu, 2023 – China
Pseudopoda lushanensis (Wang, 1990) – China
Pseudopoda lutea (Thorell, 1895) – Myanmar
Pseudopoda maeklongensis Zhao & Li, 2018 – Thailand
Pseudopoda mamillaris Zhang, Jäger & Liu, 2023 – China
Pseudopoda mamilliformis Zhang, Jäger & Liu, 2023 – Laos
Pseudopoda marmorea Jäger, 2001 – Nepal
Pseudopoda marsupia (Wang, 1991) – China, Thailand
Pseudopoda martensi Jäger, 2001 – Nepal
Pseudopoda martinae Jäger, 2001 – Nepal
Pseudopoda martinschuberti Jäger, 2015 – Myanmar
Pseudopoda mediana Quan, Zhong & Liu, 2014 – China
Pseudopoda medogensis Zhao & Li, 2018 – China
Pseudopoda megalopora Jäger, 2001 – Myanmar
Pseudopoda mengsongensis Zhang, Jäger & Liu, 2023 – Laos
Pseudopoda mingshengi Yang & Zhang, 2022 – China
Pseudopoda minor Jäger, 2001 – India
Pseudopoda mojiangensis Zhang, Jäger & Liu, 2023 – China
Pseudopoda monticola Jäger, 2001 – Nepal
Pseudopoda namkhan Jäger, Pathoumthong & Vedel, 2006 – China, Vietnam, Laos
Pseudopoda nandaensis Zhang, Jäger & Liu, 2023 – India
Pseudopoda nankunensis Zhang, Jäger & Liu, 2023 – China
Pseudopoda nanlingensis Zhang, Jäger & Liu, 2023 – China
Pseudopoda nanyueensis Tang & Yin, 2000 – China
Pseudopoda nayongensis Zhang, Jäger & Liu, 2023 – China
Pseudopoda nematodes Zhang, Jäger & Liu, 2023 – China
Pseudopoda nujiangensis Zhang, Jäger & Liu, 2023 – China
Pseudopoda nyingchiensis Zhao & Li, 2018 – China
Pseudopoda obtusa Jäger & Vedel, 2007 – China
Pseudopoda ohne Logunov & Jäger, 2015 – Vietnam
Pseudopoda olivea Zhang, Jäger & Liu, 2023 – China
Pseudopoda oliviformis Zhang, Jäger & Liu, 2023 – China
Pseudopoda pantianensis Zhang, Jäger & Liu, 2023 – China
Pseudopoda papilionacea Zhang, Jäger & Liu, 2023 – China
Pseudopoda parvipunctata Jäger, 2001 – China, Thailand
Pseudopoda peronata Zhang, Jäger & Liu, 2017 – China
Pseudopoda perplexa Jäger, 2008 – India
Pseudopoda physematosa Zhang, Jäger & Liu, 2019 – China
Pseudopoda pingu Jäger, 2015 – Myanmar
Pseudopoda platembola Jäger, 2001 – Myanmar
Pseudopoda prompta (O. Pickard-Cambridge, 1885) (type) – Pakistan, India
Pseudopoda putaoensis Zhao & Li, 2018 – Myanmar
Pseudopoda qingxiensis Zhang, Jäger & Liu, 2023 – China
Pseudopoda recta Jäger & Ono, 2001 – Taiwan
Pseudopoda rhopalocera Yang, Chen, Chen & Zhang, 2009 – China, Myanmar
Pseudopoda rivicola Jäger & Vedel, 2007 – China
Pseudopoda robusta Zhang, Zhang & Zhang, 2013 – China
Pseudopoda roganda Jäger & Vedel, 2007 – China
Pseudopoda rufosulphurea Jäger, 2001 – Thailand
Pseudopoda sacciformis Zhang, Jäger & Liu, 2023 – Laos
Pseudopoda saetosa Jäger & Vedel, 2007 – China
Pseudopoda sangzhiensis Zhang, Jäger & Liu, 2023 – Laos
Pseudopoda schawalleri Jäger, 2001 – Nepal
Pseudopoda schwendingeri Jäger, 2001 – Thailand
Pseudopoda semiannulata Zhang, Zhang & Zhang, 2013 – China
Pseudopoda semilunata Zhang, Zhang & Zhang, 2019 – China
Pseudopoda serrata Jäger & Ono, 2001 – Taiwan
Pseudopoda shacunensis Zhao & Li, 2018 – China
Pseudopoda shillongensis (Sethi & Tikader, 1988) – India
Pseudopoda shimenensis Zhang, Jäger & Liu, 2023 – China
Pseudopoda shuo Zhao & Li, 2018 – China
Pseudopoda shuqiangi Jäger & Vedel, 2007 – China
Pseudopoda sicca Jäger, 2008 – India
Pseudopoda sicyoidea Zhang, Jäger & Liu, 2017 – China
Pseudopoda signata Jäger, 2001 – China
Pseudopoda sinapophysis Jäger & Vedel, 2007 – China
Pseudopoda sinopodoides Jäger, 2001 – Nepal
Pseudopoda songi Jäger, 2008 – China
Pseudopoda spatiosa Zhang, Jäger & Liu, 2023 – Vietnam
Pseudopoda spiculata (Wang, 1990) – China
Pseudopoda spiralis Zhang, Jäger & Liu, 2023 – China
Pseudopoda spirembolus Jäger & Ono, 2002 – Japan (Ryukyu Is.)
Pseudopoda straminiosa (Kundu, Biswas & Raychaudhuri, 1999) – India
Pseudopoda strombuliformis Zhang, Jäger & Liu, 2023 – China
Pseudopoda stylaris Zhang, Jäger & Liu, 2023 – Thailand
Pseudopoda subbirmanica Zhao & Li, 2018 – Myanmar
Pseudopoda subtilis Zhang, Jäger & Liu, 2023 – China
Pseudopoda taibaischana Jäger, 2001 – China
Pseudopoda taipingensis Zhang, Jäger & Liu, 2023 – China
Pseudopoda taoi Zhang, Jäger & Liu, 2023 – China
Pseudopoda taoyuanensis Zhang, Jäger & Liu, 2023 – China
Pseudopoda tatsumii Tanikawa, 2022 – Japan (Ryukyu Is.)
Pseudopoda thorelli Jäger, 2001 – Myanmar
Pseudopoda tianpingensis Zhang, Jäger & Liu, 2023 – China
Pseudopoda tiantangensis Quan, Zhong & Liu, 2014 – China
Pseudopoda tinjura Jäger, 2001 – Nepal
Pseudopoda titan Zhao & Li, 2018 – Myanmar
Pseudopoda tji Jäger, 2015 – Myanmar
Pseudopoda tokunoshimana Tanikawa, 2022 – Japan (Ryukyu Is.)
Pseudopoda triangula Zhang, Zhang & Zhang, 2013 – China
Pseudopoda triapicata Jäger, 2001 – Nepal
Pseudopoda tricuspidata Zhang, Zhang & Zhang, 2023 – China
Pseudopoda trigonia Zhang, Jäger & Liu, 2023 – Bhutan
Pseudopoda trinacriformis Zhang, Jäger & Liu, 2023 – China
Pseudopoda trisuliensis Jäger, 2001 – Nepal
Pseudopoda uncata Yang & Zhang, 2022 – China
Pseudopoda varia Jäger, 2001 – Nepal
Pseudopoda virgata (Fox, 1936) – China
Pseudopoda wamwo Jäger, 2015 – Myanmar
Pseudopoda wang Jäger & Praxaysombath, 2009 – Laos
Pseudopoda waoensis Zhang, Jäger & Liu, 2023 – Thailand
Pseudopoda wenchuanensis Zhang, Jäger & Liu, 2023 – China
Pseudopoda wu Jäger, Li & Krehenwinkel, 2015 – China
Pseudopoda wui Zhang, Jäger & Liu, 2023 – China
Pseudopoda wulaoensis Zhang, Jäger & Liu, 2023 – China
Pseudopoda xia Zhao & Li, 2018 – Myanmar
Pseudopoda yangensis Zhang, Jäger & Liu, 2023 – China
Pseudopoda yangmingensis Zhang, Jäger & Liu, 2023 – Taiwan
Pseudopoda yangtaiensis Zhang, Jäger & Liu, 2023 – China
Pseudopoda yilanensis Zhang, Jäger & Liu, 2023 – Taiwan
Pseudopoda yinae Jäger & Vedel, 2007 – China
Pseudopoda yingjingensis Zhang, Jäger & Liu, 2023 – China
Pseudopoda yuanjiangensis Zhao & Li, 2018 – China
Pseudopoda yunfengensis Zhang, Jäger & Liu, 2023 – China
Pseudopoda yunnanensis (Yang & Hu, 2001) – China
Pseudopoda zhangi Fu & Zhu, 2008 – China
Pseudopoda zhangmuensis (Hu & Li, 1987) – China
Pseudopoda zhaoae Zhang, Jäger & Liu, 2023 – China
Pseudopoda zhejiangensis (Zhang & Kim, 1996) – China
Pseudopoda zhengi Zhang, Jäger & Liu, 2023 – Vietnam
Pseudopoda zhenkangensis Yang, Chen, Chen & Zhang, 2009 – China
Pseudopoda zixiensis Zhao & Li, 2018 – China
Pseudopoda zuoi Zhang, Jäger & Liu, 2023 – China

See also
 List of Sparassidae species

References

Araneomorphae genera
Sparassidae
Spiders of Asia